Ariajasuru Hasegawa (born 29 October 1988) is a Japanese professional footballer who plays as an attacking midfielder.

Club career
Born in Tsurugashima, Saitama, Hasegawa joined Yokohama F. Marinos' youth setup in 2004, aged 16, after starting it out at Sakado Diplomats. In November 2006 he was promoted to the main squad ahead of the following campaign and made his professional debut on 3 March 2007, in a 1–0 home win against Ventforet Kofu; however, he struggled severely with injuries during the year.

On 6 June 2008, Hasegawa signed a professional deal with Marinos, and scored his first senior goal on 29 November, netting the last in a 2–0 home success against Tokyo Verdy. During the 2010 season he was also used as a forward, but mainly as a substitute.

On 6 January 2012, Hasegawa moved to fellow league team FC Tokyo. He was mainly used as a defensive midfielder by manager Ranko Popović and scored five goals in 2013; on 29 December 2013 he extended his contract with the club.

On 16 January 2014, Hasegawa joined Cerezo Osaka, reuniting with former manager Popović. He appeared in 30 matches for the side during his first season, scoring once.

On 2 July 2015, Hasegawa moved abroad for the first time in his career, signing a one-year deal with Real Zaragoza and working with Popović for the third time.

On 29 March 2016, Hasegawa returned to Japan and play for Shonan Bellmare.

On 29 December 2017, Hasegawa signed for Nagoya Grampus.

International career
Hasegawa represented Japan in the under-20 level between 2006 and 2010, being capped three times and scoring one goal. In December 2012 he got called up to the main squad by coach Alberto Zaccheroni for a friendly against Azerbaijan, but remained unused in the 2–0 win.

Born to a Japanese mother and an Iranian father, Hasegawa is eligible to play for Japan or Iran, though Japan does not recognize dual citizenship.

Personal life

He was born to a Japanese mother and an Iranian father.

Career statistics

Club

Honours
J1 League  Player of the Month: September 2013

References

External links
Profile at Omiya Ardija
Profile at Shonan Bellmare

1988 births
Living people
Association football people from Saitama Prefecture
Japanese footballers
J1 League players
J2 League players
Segunda División players
Yokohama F. Marinos players
FC Tokyo players
Cerezo Osaka players
Real Zaragoza players
Shonan Bellmare players
Omiya Ardija players
Nagoya Grampus players
FC Machida Zelvia players
Japanese people of Iranian descent
Iranian people of Japanese descent
Japanese expatriate footballers
Japanese expatriate sportspeople in Spain
Expatriate footballers in Spain
Association football midfielders
Sportspeople of Iranian descent
Japan youth international footballers